Belaga may refer to:

 Belaga, Sarawak, town in Sarawak, island of Borneo, Malaysia
 Belaga District, Sarawak
 Belaga (state constituency), represented in the Sarawak State Legislative Assembly
 Belaga Airport, airport in Belaga, Sarawak
 Edward Belaga, Russian mathematician
 Julie Belaga (1930–2021), American politician
 Patrick Belaga (born 1991), American cellist and composer
 , a steamship